Sirenidae, the sirens, are a family of neotenic aquatic salamanders. Family members have very small fore limbs and lack hind limbs altogether. In one species, the skeleton in their fore limbs is made of only cartilage. In contrast to most other salamanders, they have external gills bunched together on the neck in both larval and adult states. Sirens are found only in the Southeastern United States and northern Mexico.

Although they are primarily carnivorous, they are the only salamanders observed eating plant material.

Description
Sirens are quite distinct from other salamanders, and in some classifications they form their own suborder, Sirenoidea, or as a completely distinct order (Meantes or Trachystomata). Genetic analysis variously places them as the sister to other Salamandroidea or as sister to all other salamanders. Many of their unique characteristics seem to be partly primitive and partly derivative.

Sirens are generally eel-like in form, with two tiny, but otherwise fully developed, fore limbs. They are neotenic, although the larval gills are small and functionless at first, and only adults have fully developed gills. Because of this, sirens most likely have evolved from a terrestrial ancestor that still had an aquatic larval stage. Like amphiumas, they are able to cross land on rainy nights.

Except for some patches of small teeth on their palates and on the splenial bone on the inner side of their lower jaws, their mouths have lost all dentition and have been replaced with a horny sheath that resembles a beak. Sirens are omnivorous, feeding mainly on worms, small snails, shrimps, and filamentous algae. They are notable among salamanders (and most amphibians, aside from a few frog species) due to their semi-herbivorous habits.

If the conditions of a water source are unsuitable, a larva will shrink its gills to mere stumps, and these may not function at all. They are also able to burrow into mud of drying ponds and encase themselves with a cocoon of mucus to survive periods of drought. During such periods, they breathe with their small but functional lungs.

Unlike other salamanders, an interventricular septum is present in the heart. At least two of the species can produce vocalizations.

The structure of sirens' reproductive systems suggests they employ external fertilization. This has finally been confirmed in captive breeding experiments, showcasing that males also engage in parental care, building nests for their offspring. Parental care among sirens is paternal due to external fertilization. In S. intermedia males circle around females and may rub or bite her flank region. Both male and female will go on their backs and turn. It is assumed here where the female spawns and the male fertilizes her eggs. After the courtship is over, the female leaves and the male guards the eggs. Males could potentially guard more than one brood, but they are known to bite females who enter a nesting site. In other salamander families where external fertilization is used, paternal care has been observed. This is critical to phylogeny, as most salamander families use external fertilization which may be pair with maternal care, meaning that sirens are one of the oldest groups of salamanders.

The combined biomass of Siren intermedia species in a Texas pond exceeded the total biomass of the pond's seven species of fish.

Taxonomy
The siren family (Sirenidae) is subdivided into five genera, three extinct, and two extant with two and three extant species, respectively:
 Genus †Habrosaurus Gilmore 1928
 †H. dilatus Gilmore 1928
 †H. prodilatus Gardner 2003
 Genus †Kababisha Evans et al. 1996
 †K. humarensis Evans et al. 1996
 †K. sudanensis Evans et al. 1996
 Genus †Noterpeton Rage et al. 1993
 †Noterpeton bolivianum Rage et al. 1993
 Genus Pseudobranchus Gray 1825 dwarf sirens
 †P. robustus Goin and Auffenberg 1955
 †P. vetustus 
 P. axanthus Netting & Goin 1942 southern dwarf siren
 P. striatus LeConte 1824 northern dwarf siren
 Genus Siren Österdam 1766 sirens
 †S. dunni Goin and Auffenberg 1957
 †S. hesterna 
 †S. miotexana 
 †S. simpsoni 
 S. intermedia Barnes 1826 lesser siren
 S. lacertina Linnaeus, 1766 greater siren
S. reticulata Graham, Kline, Steen, Kelehear, 2018 reticulated siren

References

External links
 Tree of Life: Sirenidae
 

Salamanders
 
Cenomanian first appearances
Taxa named by John Edward Gray
Amphibian families
Extant Cenomanian first appearances